Gobioclinus is a genus of labrisomid blennies from the coasts of the western Atlantic and eastern Pacific Oceans off the Americas.

Species
The following species are classified within the genus Gobioclinus:

Gobioclinus bucciferus (Poey, 1868) (Puffcheek blenny)
Gobioclinus dendriticus (Reid, 1935) (Bravo clinid)
Gobioclinus filamentosus (Springer, 1960) (Quillfin blenny)
Gobioclinus gobio (Valenciennes, 1836) (Palehead blenny)
Gobioclinus guppyi (Norman, 1922) (Mimic blenny)
Gobioclinus haitiensis (Beebe & Tee-Van, 1928) (Longfin blenny)
Gobioclinus kalisherae (D.S. Jordan, 1904) (Downy blenny)

References

 
Labrisomidae
Ray-finned fish genera